Julie Halston (born December 7, 1954) is an American actress and comedian known for her roles in television, film, and theatre.

Early life and education 
Halston was born in Flushing, Queens. Her parents, Rudolph "Rudy" Abatelli and Julia Madeline "Dolly" (née Gardner) moved to Commack, Long Island, when Halston was four years old. After attending a Catholic high school, she graduated from Hofstra University, cum laude, with a Bachelor of Arts degree in theatre arts.

Career
Halston first achieved recognition as an actress through her co-starring performances in the comedy plays of writer-performer, Charles Busch in the 1980s in New York City. She was a founding member of his theatre company, Theatre-in-Limbo, which along with other writers and performers such as Charles Ludlam, Lypsinka, Ann Magnuson, and John Fleck, to name a few, were part of a cultural movement that helped revitalize the Off-Broadway theatre. Busch considered Halston his muse and wrote many roles for her in his plays including Vampire Lesbians of Sodom (1984),The Lady in Question (1989), Red Scare on Sunset (1991), You Should be so Lucky (1994), The Divine Sister (2011), The Tribute Artist (2013).

She wrote a series of one-woman comedy shows that eventually led to a successful Off-Broadway production entitled Julie Halston's Lifetime of Comedy (1992). The show earned her an Outer Critics Circle nomination for Best Play and landed Halston a CBS network development deal. The pilot was called Those Two and co-starred Harvey Fierstein. It was written by Bob Randall, the co-producer of Kate and Allie. The show was not developed into a series and Halston returned to the stage and subsequently appeared in many Off-Broadway and Broadway shows including The Man Who Came to Dinner (2000), The Women (2001), Hairspray (2002), Gypsy (2003), Twentieth Century (2004), Anything Goes (2012-replacement), You Can't Take it with You (2014), On The Town (2015), and Tootsie (2019).

Halston received Drama Desk Award nominations for Outstanding Featured Actress in a Play for Red Scare on Sunset (1991), White Chocolate (2004), The Divine Sister (2011), and You Can't Take it With You (2014). In addition she received the Richard Seff Award for her portrayal of Gay Wellington in You Can't Take it With You. On September 26, 2021, the Tony Awards Administration Committee presented Halston with the Isabelle Stevenson Tony Award for her advocacy in raising awareness and funding for the Pulmonary Fibrosis Foundation.

Her solo comedy performances at the Birdland Jazz Club are SRO engagements that have earned her four MAC Awards (Manhattan Association of Cabarets & Clubs). In 2011, Halston received the designation "Legend of Off-Broadway" from the Off-Broadway Theatre Alliance and received an Excellence in Theatre Award from the Abington Theatre Company. In 2008, along with fellow writer Donna Daley, she co-authored the book Monologues for Show-Offs published by Heinemann Press. The book is used by casting agents, colleges, and performers for audition material. In May 2020, along with Jim Caruso, Halston launched an online talk show titled Virtual Halston on YouTube.

Halston has 43 film and TV credits to her name including the 2022 independent feature Simchas and Sorrows (Maude), Intermedium (Winona James) currently in post-production, and the 2021 independent feature The Sixth Reel (Helen) along with her starring role in the award-winning 2016 short film Hotel Bleu (Jackie). Her television credits include the HBO Max original series And Just Like That... (Bitsy von Muffling), HBO Max's Gossip Girl (Sharon), The Good Fight (Rita), HBO Max's Divorce (Sharon), Woody Allen's Crisis in Six Scenes (Roz), The TV web series The Mentors, for which she won a NYC Web Fest award for Special Guest Star (2016), Difficult People (Hazel), Law and Order, Special Victims Unit (Cassie Muir), The Electric Company (Mrs. Carruthers), Sex and The City (Bitsy von Muffling), The Class (Tina Carmello), and Law and Order (Mrs. Lapinsky). She has also appeared in the films A Very Serious Person, The Juror, Addams Family Values, Joe Gould's Secret, Drunks, Small Time Crooks, Celebrity, and I Think I Love My Wife.

Personal life
In 1992, Halston married anchor man and entertainment reporter Ralph Howard. Howard worked for WINS and the The Howard Stern Show at Sirius XM until his retirement in 2013. Howard died on August 7, 2018, from complications of pulmonary fibrosis.

Filmography

Film

Television

References

External links
 
 
 

American women comedians
American musical theatre actresses
American stage actresses
American television actresses
Hofstra University alumni
Living people
People from Flushing, Queens
21st-century American women
1954 births